The 1962 United States Senate election in Colorado took place on November 6, 1962. Incumbent Democratic U.S. Senator John A. Carroll ran for re-election to a second term in office, but was defeated by Republican U.S. Representative Peter H. Dominick.

General election

Results

See also 
 1962 United States Senate elections

References

1962
Colorado
United States Senate